Nizhneye Moshevo is a rural locality (a settlement) in Solikamsky District, Perm Krai, Russia. The population was 838 as of 2010. There are 5 streets.

Geography 
Nizhneye Moshevo is located 22 km northwest of Solikamsk (the district's administrative centre) by road. Yeskina is the nearest rural locality.

References 

Rural localities in Solikamsky District